An Awhesyth, Cornish (Kernewek) for "The Lark", is a traditional Cornish folk song.  In English, a version of this song exists called "The Lark in the Morning", and a similar song in English goes under the title "The Pretty Ploughboy" (Roud 151).

The song was collected by Rev. Sabine Baring-Gould, and appeared in his collection of Songs of the West.  The song was collected from an 81-year-old pub owner.

The English versions date back to the late eighteenth century.  One was collected in Essex by Ralph Vaughan Williams, and Frank Wilson collected another version of the song from Yorkshire.

There are several different tunes associated with these lyrics.

Cornish lyrics
An Awhesyth

English lyrics
The English lyrics run for many verses; they begin:

The lark in the morning she rises off her nest
She goes home in the evening with the dew all on her breast
And like the jolly ploughboy she whistles and she sings
She goes home in the evening with the dew all on her wings.

Oh, Roger the ploughboy he is a dashing blade
He goes whistling and singing over yonder leafy shade
He met with pretty Susan, she's handsome I declare
She is far more enticing than the birds all in the air.

References

Cornish folk songs
Cornish culture